This is a list of records relating to the Oireachtas, the national parliament of Ireland, which consists of the President of Ireland, and two Houses, Dáil Éireann, a house of representatives whose members are known as Teachtaí Dála or TDs, and Seanad Éireann, a senate whose members are known as senators.

The First Dáil consisted of the Sinn Féin MPs who were elected in the United Kingdom general election of 14 December 1918. They refused to attend the British House of Commons and instead assembled for the first time on 21 January 1919 in the Mansion House in Dublin as the revolutionary unicameral Dáil Éireann.

1,292 TDs have served in the Dáil between 1919 and 2018. The title Father of the Dáil is usually and unofficially conferred on the longest-serving member.

Longest-serving former TDs
This is a list of former TDs who have served at least 30 years in the Dáil. Unless otherwise specified, start and end dates given are those of the relevant general election. Unless stated, the TD listed did not stand in the end-date election.

Shortest-serving former TDs
This is a list of former TDs who served for less than 1 year in the Dáil. Unless otherwise specified, start and end dates given are those of the relevant general election.

The following were eligible for membership of the Dáil, but as Unionists, they did not recognise it. Those elected to Westminster in 1918 were eligible for the First Dáil.

Current office-holders, longest service in the Oireachtas
This is a list of current members of the Oireachtas who have served for at least 20 years, with continuous or broken service. Unless otherwise specified, start dates given are those of the relevant election.

Longest-serving Senators
This is a list of current and former senators who have served for at least 20 years in the Seanad, including both the Free State Seanad and the Seanad established under the 1937 Constitution. There was a 22-month gap between the abolition of the Free State Seanad in 1936 and the inauguration in 1938 of the 2nd Seanad, the first incarnation of the new body.
  denotes serving senator

Oldest living former office-holders
Aged 85 or older:

Oldest ever office-holders
Office holders aged 75 or older:

Youngest ever office-holders

Longest surviving cabinet members

Longest surviving Dáil members

Longest lived former office-holders
Aged 90 or more at time of death:

Shortest lived office-holders
Aged 40 or younger at time of death:

Longest-serving cabinet ministers (in same office)

Shortest-serving cabinet ministers
This table lists the shortest periods that a member of government held a particular ministerial office. In some of these cases, the minister held it as well as another ministerial office, being appointed after the resignation of another member of government. Acting Ministers are not listed. Jim McDaid, who was proposed as Minister for Defence on 13 November 1991, but whose name was withdrawn later that day, is not included.

People appointed to cabinet at the start of their first term as TD

People appointed as Minister of State at the start of their first term as TD

Senators appointed to cabinet

Oldest person currently in office
Politicians born before 1953:

Youngest person currently in office
Politicians born since 1983:

Members of the current Government by age

Longest service (cumulative)

Married couples/Domestic partners in the same Oireachtas

Members of both the British Parliament and of the Oireachtas
This lists those with a separate mandate to the Oireachtas and the British parliament, and therefore does not include members of the 1st Dáil.

Notes:
R Sat as a Representative peer of Ireland under the Act of Union 1800
H Sat as an Hereditary peer
L Sat as a Life peer

Diversity records

Women
First female TD – Constance Markievicz, elected to the First Dáil in 1918
First female minister – Constance Markievicz was appointed as Minister for Labour in the Ministry of Dáil Éireann from 1919 to 1922
First female Senators – Eileen Costello, Ellen Cuffe, Alice Stopford Green and Jennie Wyse Power, elected or nominated in 1922
First female Minister of State – Máire Geoghegan-Quinn was appointed Parliamentary Secretary to the Minister for Industry, Commerce and Energy in 1977 (becoming Minister of State in 1978 when the position was reformed)
First female cabinet minister since independence – Máire Geoghegan-Quinn was appointed Minister for the Gaeltacht in 1979
First female President of Ireland – Mary Robinson, who was elected in 1990 and served until 1997
First female Tánaiste – Mary Harney, appointed in 1997
First female Leader of the Opposition – Mary Lou McDonald – 2020

Religion
First Jewish Senator – Ellen Cuffe, appointed to the Irish Free State Seanad Éireann as an independent member (1922–1931)
First Jewish TD – Robert Briscoe, Fianna Fáil TD for Dublin South (1932–1948) and Dublin South-West (1948–1961)
First openly atheist TD – Jim Kemmy, Democratic Socialist Party/Labour Party TD for Limerick East 1981–1982 and 1987–1997
First Muslim TD – Moosajee Bhamjee, Labour Party TD for Clare from 1992 to 1997
First Quaker Senator – James G. Douglas, Independent Senator from 1922 to 1936 and 1938 to 1954

LGBT people

Seanad
First openly gay Oireachtas member – David Norris, Independent senator for Dublin University since 1987.
First openly lesbian Oireachtas member – Katherine Zappone, Independent senator from 2011 to 2016.
First member of the Oireachtas in a recognised same-sex relationship – Katherine Zappone, who married Ann Louise Gilligan in British Columbia, Canada in 2003. This was recognised in Irish law as a civil partnership from 2010 and as marriage from 2015.
First serving member of the Oireachtas to enter into a same-sex marriage – Jerry Buttimer (Fine Gael senator) in December 2017.
First serving member of the Oireachtas to come out as bisexual – Annie Hoey, (Labour Party senator in 2020.
First openly gay Cathaoirleach – Jerry Buttimer since December 2022.

Dáil
First openly gay TDs – John Lyons (Labour Party TD) and Dominic Hannigan (Labour Party TD), both elected in 2011.
First serving member of the Oireachtas to come out – Jerry Buttimer (Fine Gael), Senator 2007–2011 and since 2016, TD 2011–2016, came out in April 2012.
First openly lesbian TD – Katherine Zappone, Independent TD from 2016 to 2020.
First openly gay TD elected in a by-election, and first openly gay Fianna Fáil TD – Malcolm Byrne, elected in November 2019, served until February 2020.
First openly gay Social Democrats TD – Cian O'Callaghan, TD since February 2020. Previously first openly gay mayor of a city or county council in Ireland. Mayor of Fingal County Council in 2012.
First openly gay Green Party TD – Roderic O'Gorman, TD since February 2020.
First constituency to elect two openly gay TDs in the same election – Dublin West since February 2020, with O'Gorman and Varadkar.

Government
First serving cabinet minister to come out – Leo Varadkar (Fine Gael TD), first elected in 2007, became a Minister in 2011, came out in 2015. Pat Carey (Fianna Fáil) who was a TD from 1997 to 2011, and served as a Minister from 2010 to 2011, came out in 2015 after his retirement.
First openly lesbian serving cabinet Minister – Katherine Zappone, Minister from 2016 to 2020.
First openly gay Taoiseach – Leo Varadkar (Fine Gael TD), Taoiseach from June 2017 to June 2020.
First openly gay Tánaiste – Leo Varadkar (Fine Gael TD), Tánaiste from June 2020 to December 2022.
First constituency to have two openly gay cabinet Ministers – Dublin West since June 2020; Leo Varadkar and Roderic O'Gorman.

Ethnic minorities
First Indian South African/Irish of Indian descent in the Oireachtas – Moosajee Bhamjee, Labour TD for Clare 1992–1997.
First Irish of Indian descent to be a government minister (2011), Taoiseach (2017–2020) and Tánaiste (2020–present) – Leo Varadkar, Fine Gael TD elected in 2007 for Dublin West. 
First Irish of Czech descent member of the Oireachtas – Ivana Bacik, elected to the Seanad in 2007 for the Labour Party.
First Traveller member of the Oireachtas – Pádraig Mac Lochlainn, Sinn Féin TD elected to the Dáil in 2011 for Donegal.
First Senator from the Traveller community – Eileen Flynn, appointed to the Seanad in 2020.

Party leaders
Party leaders serving 10 years or more:

See also
Families in the Oireachtas
List of Irish politicians
List of Irish politicians who changed party affiliation
List of members of the Oireachtas imprisoned since 1923
List of members of the Oireachtas imprisoned during the Irish revolutionary period
List of women cabinet ministers of the Republic of Ireland
List of women in Dáil Éireann
List of women in Seanad Éireann
Records of Irish heads of government since 1922
First women holders of political offices in Ireland

Footnotes

References

External links 
 Directory of Members - Houses of the Oireachtas - Tithe an Oireachtais

Members of the Oireachtas
Lists of members of the Oireachtas
Senior legislators
Lists of Teachtaí Dála
Lists of members of Seanad Éireann